Of Thee I Sing is a phrase from the American patriotic song My Country, 'Tis of Thee (also known as "America"). The phrase may also refer to:
Of Thee I Sing, a musical by George and Ira Gershwin.
Of Thee I Sing (song), a song from the musical.
Of Thee I Sing (book), a children's book by Barack Obama.
Of Thee I Sing (poetry book), a book of poems by Timothy Liu.